Tonio Adam Andrade (born 1968) is an historian of East Asian history and the history of East Asian trading networks.

Bibliography
 Commerce, Culture, and Conflict: Taiwan Under European Rule, 1624–1662. Yale University Press, 2000.
 How Taiwan became Chinese: Dutch, Spanish, and Han colonization in the seventeenth century. Columbia University Press, 2008.
 The Limits of Empire: European Imperial Formations in Early Modern World History: Essays in Honor of Geoffrey Parker. Ashgate Publishing, 2013.
 Lost Colony: The Untold Story of China's First Great Victory over the West. Princeton University Press, 2013.
 The Gunpowder Age: China, Military Innovation, and the Rise of the West in World History. Princeton University Press, 2016.
 Early Modern East Asia: War, Commerce, and Cultural Exchange. Routledge, 2018.
 Sea Rovers, Silver, and Samurai: Maritime East Asia in Global History, 1550–1700. University of Hawaii Press, 2019.

See also
Global silver trade from the 16th to 19th centuries
Victor Lieberman
Maritime Silk Road
Nanban trade
Taiwan under Qing rule

References

External links

Academic Profile
China Center Profile
New York Review of Books Page

Emory University faculty
Historians of China
Historians of Taiwan
Living people
1968 births
University of Illinois Urbana-Champaign alumni
Reed College alumni
American military historians
21st-century American historians